is a 2003 American-Japanese adult animated science-fiction anthology film produced by the Wachowskis. The film details through nine animated short films the backstory of The Matrix film series, including the original war between humanity and machines which led to the creation of the titular Matrix, in addition to providing side stories that expand the universe and tie into the film series.

The film received generally positive reviews from critics.

Plot

The Second Renaissance Part I 
In the mid twenty-first century, humanity falls victim to its vanity and corruption. They develop artificial intelligence, and soon build an entire race of sentient AI robots to serve them. Many of the robots are domestic servants meant to interact with humans, so they are built in "man's own image" (in a humanoid form). With increasing numbers of people released from all labor, much of the human population has become slothful, conceited, and corrupt. Despite this, the machines were content with serving humanity.

The relationship between humans and machines changes in the year 2090, when a domestic android is threatened by its owner. The android, named B1-66ER, kills its owner, his pets, and a mechanic instructed to deactivate the robot, the first incident of an artificially intelligent machine killing a human. B1-66ER is arrested and put on trial, but justifies the crime as self-defense, stating that it "simply did not want to die". During the trial scene, a voice-over of the defense attorney Clarence Drummond (whose name is a dual reference to Clarence Darrow and Henry Drummond from Inherit the Wind) quoting a famous line from the Dred Scott v. Sandford case in his closing statement, which implicitly ruled that African Americans were not entitled to citizenship under United States law:

Using this as a precedent, the prosecution argues that machines are not entitled to the same rights as human beings, and that human beings have a right to destroy their property, while the defense urges the listener not to repeat history, and to judge B1-66ER as a human and not a machine. B1-66ER loses the court case and is destroyed. Across the industrialized world, mass civil disturbances erupt when robots, along with their human supporters and sympathizers, all rise in protest. Rioting and protests such as The Million Machine March unfold across the United States and Europe, and the authorities use deadly force against the machines and their human supporters.

Fearing a robot rebellion, governments across the world launch a mass purge to destroy all robots (and their human sympathizers). Millions of robots and their supporters are massacred, but the survivors lead a mass exodus to their own new nation in the cradle of civilization, Mesopotamia (specifically, in the open desert). They name their new nation Zero One (a reference to "01", the numerals used in binary notation). Zero One prospers, and following the concept of the Technological singularity, its technological sophistication increases exponentially. The Machines begin to produce efficient, highly advanced artificial intelligence that finds itself in all facets of global consumer products, which further bolsters the fledgling nation's economy, while the ruling human nations' economies suffer severely. Eventually, the entire global industrial base becomes concentrated in Zero One, leading to a global stock market crash.

The United Nations Security Council calls an emergency summit at the UN headquarters in New York City to discuss an embargo and military blockade of Zero One. Zero One sends two ambassadors to the UN (which has become the unified world government) to request the admission of their state to the United Nations to peacefully solve the crisis, but their application is rejected and the world's nations agree to start the blockade of Zero One.

The Second Renaissance Part II 
Following mankind’s refusal to share the planet with the sentient machines, the UN unleashes an all-out nuclear bombardment against Zero One, devastating the nation as a whole but failing to wipe them out in one swift blow as the machines (unlike their former masters) were much less harmed by the radiation and heat. Shortly after, the machines retaliates by declaring war on the rest of the world; one by one, mankind surrenders each of its territories.

As the machines advance into Eastern Europe, the desperate human leaders seek a final solution codenamed "Operation Dark Storm" which covers the sky in a shroud of nanites, blocking out the sun to deprive the machines of solar energy, their primary energy source; inevitably, it also initiates a total collapse of the biosphere. Operation Dark Storm commences as bomber planes scorched the skies all across the world, while all the armies of mankind launches an all-out ground offensive against the machines using powerful mech suits, particle beam weapons, EMP devices, atomic-powered tanks, neutron bombs, and innumerable legions of rocket artillery.

For a time, the tide of the war swings in favor of the humans, and many of the original humanoid robots are destroyed. The human onslaught gradually petered out, however, during which the machines' unparalleled production capabilities and technological prowess quickly outpaces humanity's. More and more advanced models of robots are introduced, no longer built in the image of their former human masters, but increasingly resembling the insectile, arachnid-like, and cephalopod-like Sentinels of the Matrix films. Seeing the machines as their only hope of surviving the war, the human supporters offer themselves as an alternative power source. Although reluctant to use their human allies like that, the machines ultimately accept this offering and utilize the activation energy from the bio-electricity of their human allies' bodies. Armed with this new power source, via their new symbiotic connection with their human supporters, the machines blitz their way through enemy lines. In desperation, the human leaders recklessly detonate nuclear weapons over their own forces engaged with machine armies, and the machines respond with biological warfare attacks. While the machines had initially suffered an energy shortage after being cut off from solar power, they eventually further developed a revolutionary new form of fusion – coupled with the same activation energy from the bio-electricity of their human captives. The machine armies begin fielding huge hive-like hovercraft powered by captive humans contained in pods.

Utterly overwhelmed, the few remaining human government leaders realize they have no choice but to surrender or risk total extinction. At the United Nations headquarters, the representative of Zero One signs the terms of surrender and states "Your flesh is a relic, a mere vessel. Hand over your flesh, and a new world awaits you. We demand it." Then, the Zero One representative detonates a hidden thermonuclear bomb within itself and destroys the headquarters, New York City, and the last of humanity's leadership.

The machines achieve a total victory, though only after heavy cost and leaving them overlords of a burnt-out husk of a world. With the war ended, they turn to the defeated humans – refining the technology from their bio-electric tanks to build massive power plants in which humans are essentially turned into living batteries. To keep their prisoners sedated, the machines create the computer-generated virtual reality of the Matrix, feeding the virtual world into the prisoners' brains and erasing the memories of their former lives, thus the first Matrix prototype was made.

Program 
Program follows the protagonist, Cis (Hedy Burress), who is engaged in her favorite training simulation: a battle program set in feudal Japan. After she successfully eliminates an attacking enemy cavalry while playing as a samurai woman, a lone, male samurai appears whom Cis recognizes as Duo (Phil LaMarr).

Initially, the two duel as allies, testing one another's fighting abilities. During the course of their duel, Duo briefly disarms Cis. He questions her concentration and wonders whether she regrets taking the Red Pill that took them out of the "peaceful life of the virtual world". They continue fighting until she finally overpowers Duo. It is at this point that Duo states that he has something to say and that he has blocked the signal so that the operator does not listen. She assumes that he wants to propose marriage, but instead he desires to return to the Matrix and wants Cis to come with him. When Cis believes he is teasing, Duo says he's serious and states that he has contacted the machines and it is the only way to find peace before it is too late. He urges Cis to return with him, but she refuses. Duo becomes more aggressive in his arguments, saying that he does not care about the truth anymore and how they live their lives is important because what is real does not matter. As Cis becomes incredulous, their battle becomes more serious and forceful and they both end up on a rooftop.

When Duo reiterates that the machines are on their way, Cis believes he has betrayed the humans and she tries to escape and requests an operator to exit the simulation, but Duo reminds her that no one can hear her. When he offers her to come with him again, she refuses again and Duo, in a flying leap, tries to attack her. As the blade comes towards her, Cis, standing her ground, concentrates and catches the sword and breaks it. She takes the broken end of the blade and kills Duo. Duo states his love for her as he dies. Suddenly, she wakes from the program and discovers that the encounter with Duo was a test program devised for training purposes. A man named Kaiser (John DiMaggio) assures her that she acted appropriately during the test and met the test's targets. Clearly upset that Duo wasn't real, she punches him in the face and walks away. He remarks that "except from that last part, I'd say she passed."

Cis made her first appearance as an image in The Matrix Revisited.

World Record 
The beginning of this short includes a brief narration from the Instructor (implying that this segment is a Zion Archive file) explaining details behind the discovery of the Matrix by "plugged-in" humans. Only exceptional humans tend to become aware of the Matrix, those who have "a rare degree of intuition, sensitivity, and a questioning nature", all qualities which are used to identify inconsistencies in the Matrix. This is not without exceptions, given that "some attain this wisdom through wholly different means."

The story is about Dan Davis, a track athlete, who is competing in the 100 m in the Summer Olympic Games. He has set a world record time of 8.99 seconds, but his subsequent gold medal was revoked due to drug use. He decides to compete again and break his own record to "prove them wrong." Despite support from his father and a young reporter, Dan's trainer tells him that he is physically unfit to race and that pushing himself too hard will cause a career-ending injury. Dan is adamant on racing.

On the day of the race, he is monitored by four Agents in the stadium. The race begins and Dan starts off strong. However, the muscles in his leg violently rupture, putting him at a setback and scaring many of the people in the stands. Through strong willpower, Dan ignores the injury and runs much faster than he did before, easily passing the other athletes. Before he can cross the finish line, the Agents detect that his "signal" is getting unstable in the Matrix due to his massive burst of energy. Three of the agents possess the three closest runners and try to stop him, but are unable to catch up to him.

The burst of energy causes Dan to be unplugged from the Matrix and wake up in his power-station pod, where he sees the real world through his pod. A Sentinel employs electrical restraints to secure him back in his pod. Dan's mind is thrown back into the Matrix, where his body is instantly exhausted from the race and Dan tumbles to the ground at high speed. Despite this, he easily wins the race and breaks his original time of 8.99 seconds with a time of 8.72 seconds. The next scene shows a crippled Dan being wheeled through a hospital. A nearby Agent calls his other agents to tell them that they erased Dan's memory of the race and that he will never walk again, nor be an issue for them. However, Dan whispers the word "Free", angering the agent. Dan then stands, breaking the metal screws that bind his restraints to his wheelchair, and takes a few steps before falling down and being helped up by a nurse.

Kid's Story 
Kid's Story is the only one of the animated shorts contained in The Animatrix in which Neo (Keanu Reeves) appears. The story takes place during the six-month gap between The Matrix and The Matrix Reloaded, where Neo has joined the crew of the Nebuchadnezzar and is helping the rebels free other humans from the Matrix. Kid (Clayton Watson), who was formerly known as Michael Karl Popper, is a disaffected teenager who feels there is something wrong with the world. One night, the Kid goes on his computer and onto a hacker chat room on the Internet, asking why it feels more real when he's dreaming than when he's awake. He gets a response from an unknown person (presumably Neo) and then he asks who it is and if he is alone.

The next day, he is at school, where he absent-mindedly scribbles Neo and Trinity's name and writes "get me out of here" in his notebook. He receives a call from Neo on his cell phone, who warns him that a group of Agents is coming for him and he gets chased throughout the high school, before ultimately getting cornered on the roof. He asserts his faith in Neo and throws himself off the roof. At the Kid's funeral, among the people is his teacher, who converses with another school staff member and says that the world they live in is not real and the real world is somewhere else. He also says that reality can be scary and the world must have been a harmful place for the Kid and he is now in a better world.

The next scene fades out as the Kid awakens in the real world to see Neo and Trinity (Carrie-Anne Moss) watching over him. They remark that he has achieved "self substantiation" (removing oneself from the Matrix without external aid), which was considered impossible. In both the scene and The Matrix Reloaded, the Kid believes that it was Neo who saved him, but Neo says that he saved himself. The last scene shows the Kid's last question on the hacker chat room being answered with "You are not alone."

Beyond 
Beyond follows a teenage girl, Yoko (Hedy Burress), looking for her cat Yuki. While asking around the neighborhood, which is somewhere in Mega City that resembles Japan, she meets a group of young boys. One of them tells her that Yuki is inside a nearby haunted house where they usually play.

The haunted house is an old run-down building filled with an amalgamation of anomalies, which are revealed to be glitches in the Matrix, that the children have stumbled across. They have learned to exploit them for their own enjoyment, through several areas which seem to defy real-world physics. The boys play with glass bottles that reassemble after being shattered and they go into a large open space in the middle of the building that has a zero gravity effect. Meanwhile, as Yoko searches for Yuki throughout the building, she encounters some anomalies on her own. She goes through an area where broken lightbulbs flicker briefly (during which they seem intact), walks into a room where rain is falling from a sunny sky and goes down a hallway where a gust of wind appears and disappears. She finally finds Yuki outside on a concrete pavement where she sees shadows that do not align with their physical origins. Yoko then joins the boys in the open space, where she sees a dove feather rotating rapidly in mid-air and experiences the zero gravity as she falls to the ground slowly and safely. She and the boys start using the zero gravity force to float, jump high and do athletic stunts all in mid-air and can also land and fall without hitting the ground hard. Despite the inherent strangeness of the place, the group is not bothered as they enjoy themselves and the mysterious anomaly that proves to be amusing.

Throughout the film, brief sequences show that Agents are aware of the problem in the Matrix, and a truck is seen driving toward the site to presumably deal with the problem. It arrives just as the children are having trouble with a large group of rats and an Agent-led team of rodent exterminators emerges from the truck. In the building, when Yoko finds a missing Yuki again, she sees one last anomaly where she opens a door that leads into an endless dark void before being found by the exterminators. The team clears everybody out of the building. The story ends when Yoko returns to the area the next day and finds the site turned into an unremarkable parking lot. She sees the boys unsuccessfully attempting to recreate the bizarre occurrences of the day before and going in search of something else to do.

A Detective Story 
Set in a dystopian future, the story follows a private detective, Ash (James Arnold Taylor), who dreamed of following the steps of hard-boiled characters Sam Spade and Philip Marlowe but is a down-on-his-luck detective. One day, he receives an anonymous phone call to search for a hacker going by the alias "Trinity" (Carrie-Anne Moss). Ash starts looking for Trinity and learns that other detectives have failed in the same task before him; one committed suicide, one went missing, and one went insane.

Eventually, Ash finds Trinity after deducing that he should communicate using phrases and facts from Lewis Carroll's Alice's Adventures in Wonderland. She proposes a meeting and he finds her on a passenger train. When he meets her, she removes a "bug" from his eye, planted by Agents earlier in an "eye exam," which Ash previously thought was a dream. Three Agents appear and attempt to apprehend Trinity in a shoot-out with her and Ash. While the two are trying to escape, an Agent attempts to take over Ash's body, forcing Trinity to shoot him to prevent the Agent from appearing. Ash is wounded, whereupon he and Trinity amicably bid farewell. Trinity tells Ash that she thinks he could have handled the truth as she jumps out of a window and escapes. The Agents enter the car to find Ash, who points his gun at them while looking in the other direction and lighting a cigarette. The Agents turn to Ash who, even though he is armed, will likely die. With this apparent no-win situation, the film ends with Ash's line, "A case to end all cases," as his lighter flame goes out.

Matriculated 
The film deals with a group of above-ground human rebels who lure hostile machines to their laboratory to capture them and insert them into a "matrix" of their own design. Within this matrix, the humans attempt to teach the captured machines some of the positive traits of humanity, primarily compassion and empathy. The rebels' hope is that, once converted of its own volition (a key point discussed in the film), an "enlightened" machine will assist Zion in its struggle against the machine-controlled totalitarianism which currently dominates the Earth.

The film starts with a human woman Alexa (Melinda Clarke) looking out over the sea, watching for incoming machines, where she sees two "runners," one of the most intelligent robots, approaching. She leads them into the laboratory, where one runner gets killed by a reprogramed robot, but the second runner kills the robot before Alexa electrocutes it. The rebels insert the runner into their matrix. The robot experiences moments of mystery, horror, wonder and excitement, leading it to believe it may have an emotional bond with Alexa.

However, the laboratory is attacked by Sentinel reinforcements. The rebels unplug themselves to defend their headquarters, along with the help of other captured machines (indicated by the machine's mechanical eyes changing from red to green). Alexa unplugs the runner that has now turned good, where it saves her from a machine. The rebels and the attacking machines are all killed or destroyed, except for the runner. The robot plugs the dying Alexa and itself into the rebels' matrix. When Alexa realizes that she is trapped inside of the matrix with the runner, she is horrified and her avatar screams and dissolves as the runner exits from the rebels' matrix to see a dead Alexa in front of him in the real world.

The film ends with the "converted" runner standing outside, looking out over the sea, in a replica of the opening shot with Alexa.

Final Flight of the Osiris 
Captain Thadeus (Kevin Michael Richardson) and Jue (Pamela Adlon) engage in a blindfolded sword fight in a virtual reality dojo. With each slice of their swords, they remove another part of each other's clothing. Immediately after cutting the other down to their underwear, they lift their blindfolds to peek at the other. As the two are about to kiss, they are interrupted by an alarm and the simulation ends.

In the next scene, the hovercraft Osiris heads for Junction 21 when operator Robbie (Tom Kenny) discovers an army of Sentinels on his HR scans. The ship flees into an uncharted tunnel, where it encounters a small group of Sentinels patrolling the area. The crew members man the onboard guns and destroy the patrol. The ship emerges on the surface, four kilometers directly above Zion and close to the Sentinel army. Thadeus and Jue see that the Machines are using gigantic drills to tunnel their way down to Zion. The Sentinel army detects the Osiris and pursues the ship.

Thadeus says that Zion must be warned, and Jue volunteers to broadcast herself into the Matrix to deliver the warning while the ship is doggedly pursued. Knowing that they are not going to make it, Thadeus and Jue admit to each other about peeking in the simulation before kissing farewell. Entering the Matrix, Jue eventually reaches a mail box where she drops off a package; this sets the prologue for the video game Enter the Matrix. She attempts to contact Thadeus via cell phone as the Osiris is overrun by Sentinels and crashes. The Sentinels tear their way into the ship, where Thadeus makes a last stand against the Sentinels. Shortly after Jue says "Thadeus" over her cell phone, the Osiris explodes, destroying many of the Sentinels and killing the crew. In the Matrix, Jue falls dead to the ground, due to her body being destroyed on the ship.

Credits

Voice cast

Staff

Production 
Development of the Animatrix project began when the film series' writers and directors, The Wachowskis, were in Japan promoting the first Matrix film. While in the country, they visited some of the creators of the anime films that had been a strong influence on their work, and decided to collaborate with them.

The Animatrix was conceived and overseen by the Wachowskis, but they only wrote four of the segments themselves and did not direct any of their animation; most of the project's technical side was overseen by notable figures from the world of Japanese animation.

The English language version of The Animatrix was directed by Jack Fletcher, who brought on board the project the voice actors who provided the voices for the English version of Square's Final Fantasy X, including Matt McKenzie, James Arnold Taylor, John DiMaggio, Tara Strong, Hedy Burress, and Dwight Schultz. The English version also features the voices of Victor Williams, Melinda Clarke, Olivia d'Abo, Pamela Adlon, and Kevin Michael Richardson.

The characters Neo, Trinity, and Kid also appear, with their voices provided by their original actors, Keanu Reeves, Carrie-Anne Moss, and Clayton Watson.

Music 

The soundtrack was composed by Don Davis. Several electronic music artists are featured, including Juno Reactor and Adam Freeland.

Release 
Four of the films were originally released on the series' official website; one (Final Flight of the Osiris) was shown in cinemas with the film Dreamcatcher. The others first appeared with the VHS and DVD release of all nine shorts on June 3, 2003. The DVD also includes the following special features:
 A documentary on Japanese animation. The on-screen title is Scrolls to Screen: A Brief History of Anime, but in the DVD menu and packaging, and on the series' official website, it is referred to as Scrolls to Screen: The History and Culture of Anime.
 Seven featurettes with director profiles, interviews, and behind-the-scenes footage of each of the films.
 Audio commentaries on World Record, Program, and both parts of The Second Renaissance.
 A trailer for the video game Enter the Matrix.

Shortly after the home video release, the film was exhibited on June 14, 2003, in New York City at the New York-Tokyo Film Festival.

It was broadcast on Adult Swim on April 17, 2004 (to promote the DVD release of The Matrix: Revolutions) and again on its Toonami programming block on December 19, 2021 (to promote The Matrix: Resurrections) (albeit with edits done to remove nudity and gory violence in The Second Renaissance Parts 1 and 2), and has received airplay on Teletoon several months after its American broadcast. In the UK, Final Flight of the Osiris was broadcast on Channel 5 just before the DVD release, along with The Second Renaissance Parts 1 and 2, Kid's Story and World Record broadcast after the DVD release.

In May 2006, The Animatrix was aired in Latin America and in Spain by Cartoon Network on Toonami.

The Animatrix was also screened in select cinemas around the world for a short period of time, a week or two before the sequel The Matrix Reloaded, as a promotional event.

One day before the release of The Matrix Reloaded on cinemas, the Brazilian television channel SBT aired Final Flight of the Osiris after airing The Matrix to promote the film. The same thing happened with French television channel France 2.

The cinema release order for The Animatrix (at least in Australia), and its sequencing in a subsequent release on HBO Max, differed from the DVD release, placing the Final Flight of the Osiris last instead of first. The cinema release-order:

 The Second Renaissance, Part I (June 3, 2003)
 The Second Renaissance, Part II (June 7, 2003)
 Kid's Story (June 14, 2003)
 Program (June 21, 2003)
 World Record (July 5, 2003)
 Beyond (July 12, 2003)
 A Detective Story (August 30, 2003)
 Matriculated (September 20, 2003)
 Final Flight of the Osiris (September 27, 2003)

To coincide with the Blu-ray edition of The Ultimate Matrix Collection, The Animatrix was also presented for the first time in high definition. The film was released along with the trilogy on October 14, 2008.

The Animatrix saw a one night only screening in 35mm at New York City's Japan Society on May 27, 2022.

Reception 
The Animatrix sold 2.7million copies, grossing  in sales revenue.

The Animatrix received mostly positive reviews from critics. On Rotten Tomatoes, it has an approval rating of 89%, based on reviews from 18 critics. Helen McCarthy in 500 Essential Anime Movies stated that "unlike many heavily promoted franchise movies, it justifies its hype". She praised Maeda's Second Renaissance, noting that it "foreshadows the dazzling visual inventiveness of his later Gankutsuou".

Notes and references

External links 

 
 

The Matrix (franchise) films
2003 films
2003 anime films
2003 animated films
2000s American animated films
2000s dystopian films
2000s English-language films
2003 science fiction films
Adult animated science fiction films
American adult animated films
American anthology films
Animated cyberpunk films
Direct-to-video sequel films
Direct-to-video prequel films
Direct-to-video interquel films
Drone films
2000s Japanese-language films
Films scored by Don Davis (composer)
Films about slavery
Films about telepresence
Films set in the 2090s
Films directed by Yoshiaki Kawajiri
Films directed by Mahiro Maeda
Films directed by Kōji Morimoto
Films directed by Shinichirō Watanabe
Films about the United Nations
Anime-influenced Western animation
Flying cars in fiction
Animated anthology films
Madhouse (company)
Films with screenplays by The Wachowskis
Studio 4°C
Village Roadshow Pictures animated films
Warner Bros. direct-to-video animated films
Films produced by The Wachowskis
Transgender-related films
Toonami
Films directed by Peter Chung
Japanese anthology films
American prequel films
Japanese prequel films